
Gmina Sępólno Krajeńskie is an urban-rural gmina (administrative district) in Sępólno County, Kuyavian-Pomeranian Voivodeship, in north-central Poland.

The gmina contains part of the protected area called Krajna Landscape Park.

Villages
Apart from the town of Sępólno Krajeńskie, Gmina Sępólno Krajeńskie contains the villages and settlements of Chmielniki, Dziechowo, Grochowiec, Iłowo, Jazdrowo, Kawle, Komierówko, Komierowo, Lutówko, Lutowo, Niechorz, Piaseczno, Radońsk, Sikorz, Skarpa, Świdwie, Teklanowo, Trzciany, Wałdówko, Wałdowo, Wilkowo, Wiśniewa, Wiśniewka, Włościborek, Włościbórz, Wysoka Krajeńska, Zalesie and Zboże.

Neighbouring gminas
Gmina Sępólno Krajeńskie is bordered by the gminas of Debrzno, Gostycyn, Kamień Krajeński, Kęsowo, Lipka, Sośno and Więcbork.

External links
Polish official population figures 2006

Sepolno Krajenskie
Sępólno County